First Presbyterian Church is a historic church at 410 West Kaufman Street in Paris, Texas.

It was built in 1892, and added to the National Register in 1988.

See also

National Register of Historic Places listings in Lamar County, Texas
Recorded Texas Historic Landmarks in Lamar County

References

Presbyterian churches in Texas
Churches on the National Register of Historic Places in Texas
Churches completed in 1892
19th-century Presbyterian church buildings in the United States
Churches in Lamar County, Texas
Paris, Texas
1892 establishments in Texas
National Register of Historic Places in Lamar County, Texas
Recorded Texas Historic Landmarks